Nick Cope (born 8 December) is an English musician running regular music sessions in Oxfordshire for young children and their families. Cope also performs at schools and theatres and music festivals in the UK and overseas.

Cope was previously the lead singer in the rock band The Candyskins.

Discography 
What Colour Is Your T-Shirt (2009)
My Socks (2011)
Why Is the Sky Blue? (2012)
The Pirate's Breakfast (2014)
 A Round of Applause for the Dinosaurs (2016)
Have You Heard About Hugh? (2018)

Television 
In April 2020, Cope starred in a CBeebies programme called Nick Cope's Popcast.

Personal life 
Cope lives in Oxford with his partner Amanda. They have three children.

References

External links 
 

20th-century births
Living people
21st-century English musicians
British children's musicians
English male musicians
21st-century British male musicians